Flickan från Paradiset ("The girl from paradise") is a 1924 Swedish drama film directed by Theodor Berthels.

Synopsis 
Torkel Gudmundson is the proud owner of a beautiful farm, called Paradise. His wife Hilda, however, longs to move back to the city, and Ruterberg, an engineer, wants to buy the farm from him because he believes there to be iron ore in the ground (which fact he keeps from Torkel).

Eventually, after Börje, Torkel's younger son, is saved from drowning in the river by Ruterberg, Torkel sells the farm. The family moves to the city, and there it runs into many hardships.

Cast 

 Mathias Taube - Torkel Gudmundson
 Hilda Borgström - Märta, his wife
Jessie Wessel - Hildur, their daughter
 Gösta Nohre - Ragnar, the elder son
 Åke West - Börje, the younger son
 Fridolf Rhudin - Måns Persson
 Carl Ström - the engineer Ruterberg
 Uno Henning - John Wiksjö
 Wictor Hagman - Harry Karlsson, convict
 Ingeborg Olsen - Gudrun, Ragnar's girlfriend
 Gösta Hillberg - Detective
 Nils Andersson - Detective
 Thure Jarl - Detective

External links 
 https://www.imdb.com/title/tt0014910/

References 

1924 films
1924 drama films
1920s Swedish-language films
Swedish drama films
Swedish silent feature films
Silent drama films